Doggie (born April 19, 1966, in Køge) is a Danish artist, who was based in Copenhagen and Istanbul as of 2007.

He was one of the pioneers of Danish Hip-Hop and in the early 80's, he became a member of The New Nation and started the graffiti crew The Dark Roses. He studied advertising and worked as an AD and as a graphic designer since 1988. He made several Hip-Hop jams, AV-shows and became involved in Scandinavian graffiti exhibitions/shows as well. He lived and worked in Amsterdam, New York City and Montpelier where he developed his 'tup' paintings and sculptures 'What you see is what you get'.

Selected exhibitions
2006 Dec. Angels – Marienlyst Slot - Elsinore Museum
2007 Feb. Anioly - Domoteka - Warszaw, Poland
2007 Apr. Galeria BB - Kraków, Poland
2007 Jun. Baby, You Can Drive My Car - Marienlyst Slot - Elsinore Museum  Marienlyst Slot, Elsinore
2008 May. I killed your family

Selected literature
1985 Dansk Wildstyle Graffiti af Peter Skaarup, Libero

References

Danish painters
Modern painters
1966 births
Living people
People from Køge Municipality